Clement Ekpeye is an Anglican bishop in Nigeria: he is the current Bishop of Ahoada one of nine in the  Anglican Province of the Niger Delta, itself one of 14 within the Church of Nigeria.

Ekpeye was consecrated Bishop of the newly created Anglican Diocese of Ahoada on 25 July 2004 at the Cathedral Church of the Advent, Abuja.

Notes

21st-century Anglican bishops in Nigeria
Anglican bishops of Ahoada